Elmar Lipping (7 March 1906 in Riga – 5 January 1994 in New York City) was an Estonian statesman and soldier. He emigrated to the United States and lived in Flushing, Queens. He was Estonian foreign minister in exile from June 3, 1982 to June 20, 1990.

References

1906 births
1994 deaths
Politicians from Riga
People from the Governorate of Livonia
Government ministers of Estonia
Estonian World War II refugees
Estonian emigrants to the United States